Sevugampatti is a panchayat town in Dindigul district in the Indian state of Tamil Nadu.Sevugampatti is a suburb of Batlagundu.

Demographics
As of the 2001 India census, Sevugampatti had a population of 9521. Males constitute 51% of the population and females 49%. Sevugampatti has an average literacy rate of 65%, higher than the national average of 59.5%: male literacy is 74%, and female literacy is 55%. In Sevugampatti, 11% of the population is under 6 years of age.

References

Cities and towns in Dindigul district